Laura María Bueno Fernández (born 25 May 1993) is a Spanish sprinter specialising in the 400 metres. She represented her country at the 2021 World Athletics Relays – Women's 4 × 400 metres relay. Laura Bueno is the captain of the Spanish women's 4x400 relay team.

International competitions

Personal bests
Outdoor
100 metres – 12.43 (Málaga 2020)
400 metres – 52.14 (Berlín 2018)

Indoor
200 metres – 24.47 (Antequera 2019)
400 metres – 52.67 (Glasgow 2018)
800 metres – 2:06.26 (Sabadell-2019)

National récords

Outdoor
500 metres – 1:11.33 (Antequera 2019)
600 metres – 1:28.14 (Antequera 2019)

Indoor
500 metres – 1:11.13 (Granada 2017)
600 metres – 1:26.21 (Barcelona 2018)

Social Networks
Instagram: @labfdez 
Visit her website: www.laurabueno.webnode.es

Official sponsor
Nike (1 January 2018 - 2021)

References

External links
 
 
 
 

1993 births
Living people
Spanish female sprinters
Sportspeople from Granada
Mediterranean Games bronze medalists for Spain
Mediterranean Games medalists in athletics
Athletes (track and field) at the 2018 Mediterranean Games
Athletes (track and field) at the 2020 Summer Olympics
Olympic athletes of Spain
21st-century Spanish women